Madame Tussauds is a wax museum founded in  by French wax sculptor Marie Tussaud in London, spawning similar museums in major cities around the world. While it used to be spelled as "Madame Tussaud's", the apostrophe is no longer used. Madame Tussauds is a major tourist attraction in many cities, displaying the waxworks of famous and historical figures, as well as popular film and television characters.

History

Background

Marie Tussaud was born as Marie Grosholtz in 1761 in Strasbourg, France. Her mother worked for Philippe Curtius in Bern, Switzerland, who was a physician skilled in wax modeling. Curtius taught Tussaud the art of wax modelling beginning when she was a child. He moved to Paris and took his young apprentice, then only 6 years old, with him.

Grosholtz created her first wax sculpture in 1777 of Voltaire. At the age of 17, she became the art tutor to Madame Elizabeth, the sister of King Louis XVI of France, at the Palace of Versailles. During the French Revolution, she was imprisoned for three months and awaiting execution, but was released after the intervention of an influential friend. During the Revolution, she made models of many prominent victims.

Grosholtz inherited Curtius's vast collection of wax models following his death in 1794. For the next 33 years, she travelled around Europe with a touring show from the collection. She married Francois Tussaud in 1795 and took his surname. She renamed her show as Madame Tussaud's. In 1802, she accepted an invitation from Paul Philidor, a lantern and phantasmagoria pioneer, to exhibit her work alongside his show at the Lyceum Theatre, London. She did not fare particularly well financially, with Philidor taking half of her profits.

She was unable to return to France because of the Napoleonic Wars, so she traveled throughout Great Britain and Ireland exhibiting her collection. From 1831, she took a series of short leases on the upper floor of "Baker Street Bazaar" (on the west side of Baker Street, Dorset Street, and King Street in London). This site was later featured in the Druce-Portland case sequence of trials of 1898–1907. This became Tussaud's first permanent home in 1836.

Origins

By 1835, Marie Tussaud had settled down in Baker Street, London and opened a museum. One of the main attractions of her museum was the Chamber of Horrors. The name is often credited to a contributor to Punch in 1845, but Tussaud appears to have originated it herself, using it in advertising as early as 1843.

This part of the exhibition included victims of the French Revolution and newly created figures of murderers and other criminals. Other famous people were added, including Lord Nelson, the Duke of Wellington, Henry VIII and Queen Victoria.

Some sculptures still exist that were made by Marie Tussaud herself. The gallery originally contained some 400 different figures, but fire damage in 1925, coupled with German bombs in 1941, severely damaged most of such older models. The casts themselves have survived, allowing the historical waxworks to be remade, and these can be seen in the museum's history exhibit. The oldest figure on display is that of Madame du Barry, the work of Curtius from 1765 and part of the waxworks left to Grosholtz at his death. Other faces from the time of Tussaud include Robespierre and George III. In 1842, she made a self-portrait, which is now on display at the entrance of her museum. She died in her sleep in London on 16 April 1850.

By 1883, the restricted space and rising cost of the Baker Street site prompted her grandson Joseph Randall to commission construction of a building at the museum's current location on Marylebone Road. The new exhibition galleries were opened on 14 July 1884 and were a great success. But Randall had bought out his cousin Louisa's half share in the business in 1881, and that plus the building costs resulted in his having too little capital. He formed a limited company in 1888 to attract fresh capital but it had to be dissolved after disagreements between the family shareholders. In February 1889 Tussaud's was sold to a group of businessmen, led by Edwin Josiah Poyser. The first wax sculpture of a young Winston Churchill was made in 1908; a total of ten have been made since. The first overseas branch of Madame Tussauds was opened in Amsterdam in 1970.

Ownership changes
In 2005, Madame Tussauds was sold to a company in Dubai, Dubai International Capital, for £800m (US$1.5bn). In May 2007, The Blackstone Group purchased The Tussauds Group from then-owner Dubai International Capital for US$1.9 billion; the company was merged with Blackstone's Merlin Entertainments and operation of Madame Tussauds was taken over by Merlin. After the Tussauds acquisition, Dubai International Capital gained 20% of Merlin Entertainment.

On 17 July 2007, as part of the financing for the Tussauds deal, Merlin sold the freehold of Madame Tussauds to private investor Nick Leslau and his investment firm Prestbury under a sale and leaseback agreement. Although the attraction sites are owned by Prestbury, they are operated by Merlin based on a renewable 35-year lease.

Recent status

Madame Tussaud's wax museum became a major tourist attraction in London. Until 2010, it incorporated the London Planetarium in its west wing. A large animated dark ride, The Spirit of London, opened in 1993. Today's wax figures at Tussauds include historical and royal figures, film stars, sports stars, and famous murderers. It has been known since 2007 as "Madame Tussauds" museums (no apostrophe).

In July 2008, Madame Tussauds' Berlin branch became embroiled in controversy when a 41-year-old German man brushed past two guards and decapitated a wax figure depicting Adolf Hitler. This was believed to be an act of protest against showing the ruthless dictator alongside sports heroes, movie stars, and other historical figures. The statue has since been repaired, and the perpetrator has admitted that he attacked the statue to win a bet. The original model of Hitler was unveiled in Madame Tussauds London in April 1933; it was frequently vandalised and a 1936 replacement had to be carefully guarded. In January 2016, the statue of Adolf Hitler was removed from the Chamber of Horrors section in the London museum in response to an open letter sent by a staff writer of The Jewish Journal of Greater Los Angeles, followed by significant support for its removal from social media.

The first Madame Tussauds in India opened in New Delhi on 1 December 2017. Its operator, Merlin Entertainments, planned an investment of 50 million pounds over the next 10 years. It features over 50 wax models, including political and entertainment figures such as Ariana Grande, Amitabh Bachchan, Salman Khan, Katrina Kaif, Sachin Tendulkar, Kim Kardashian, Tom Cruise, Leonardo DiCaprio, Scarlett Johansson, Angelina Jolie, Asha Bhosle, Kapil Dev, and Mary Kom.

On 30 December 2020, the holding company of Madame Tussauds Wax Museum in Delhi, India confirmed a temporary shutdown of the Museum. It is scheduled to reopen in 2022.

Museum locations

Asia
  Beijing, China (2014)
  Chongqing, China (2016)
  Shanghai, China (2006)
  Wuhan, China (2013)
  Hong Kong (2000)
  Delhi, India (2017)
  Tokyo, Japan (2013)
  Singapore (2014)
  Bangkok, Thailand (2010)
  Dubai, United Arab Emirates (2021)

Europe
  Amsterdam, Netherlands (1970)
  Berlin, Germany (2008)
  Blackpool, United Kingdom (2011)
  Budapest, Hungary (2022)
  Istanbul, Turkey (2016)
  London, United Kingdom (1835)
  Prague, Czech Republic (2019)
  Vienna, Austria (2011)

North America
  Hollywood, United States (2009)
  Las Vegas, United States (1999)
  Nashville, United States (2017)
  New York City, United States (2000)
  Orlando, United States (2015)
  San Francisco, United States (2014)
  Washington, D.C., United States (2007-2021)

Oceania
  Sydney, Australia (2012)

In popular culture

Celebrity poses with their wax figures
Celebrities have often posed like their wax figures as pranks and publicity stunts:
 On 3 November 2009, the museum's New York City branch was featured in a segment on NBC's Today in which weatherman Al Roker posed in place of his lifelike wax figure for two hours and startled unsuspecting visitors, who were at first led to believe they were viewing Roker's wax counterpart.
 In 2010, Ozzy Osbourne did similarly in New York to promote his album Scream (2010).
 NBA players Carmelo Anthony and Jeremy Lin pranked fans during the unveiling of their statues at the New York and San Francisco museums, respectively.
 In 2015, Arnold Schwarzenegger posed as the Terminator statue in the Hollywood museum, to promote a charity event.
Ant and Dec pranked Olly Murs by tricking him into using a machine that will "scan every part of Olly's face and body to create the most accurate wax figure ever" as a part of their annual Undercover segment on their show, Ant and Dec's Saturday Night Takeaway.

Films
 Some sequences of the film Housefull 3 were shot in the Madame Tussauds, London.
 Parts of the film Fan (2016) were shot at Madame Tussauds, making it the first Indian film to be shot there.
 Madame Tussauds features in the film Shanghai Knights (2003).

Games
 Marie Tussaud is featured in an Assassin's Creed Unity side mission, where the player is tasked with retrieving the severed heads of which Madame Tussaud was commissioned to make replicas.
 Madame Tussaud is referenced as "Madame Tusspell" in The Great Ace Attorney 2: Resolve, where the player is tasked to investigate in the wax museum.

Literature
 In Thomas Hardy's novel The Return of the Native (published 1878) the Christmas congregation at a country church is likened to "a Tussaud collection of [local] celebrities".
 There is a brief reference to Madame Tussaud's work in the Sherlock Holmes story "The Mazarin Stone".
 In Jules Verne's novel Around the World in Eighty Days, his author says that the only thing the wax figures sculpted by Madame Tussaud lack is speech.
 In Elizabeth Bowen's novel The Death of the Heart (1938), Portia and Eddie have tea at Madame Tussaud's and Portia is disappointed that the waitresses are real and not made of wax.
 In the novel Edgar Allan Poe and the London Monster (2016) by Karen Lee Street, Madame Tussaud meets twice with Edgar Allan Poe and C. Auguste Dupin at her exhibition halls.

Music
 In Gilbert and Sullivan's song "My Object All Sublime", from The Mikado (1885), the title character sings of punishments fitting the crime, including:

 Madame Tussauds is the focus of Steve Taylor's song "Meltdown (at Madame Tussauds)", which describes someone turning up the thermostat and causing the wax figures to melt. Taylor wrote the song as "a new metaphor to ask [the] same question" as Jesus, "What good is it for a man to gain the whole world, yet forfeit his soul?"
 The Beatles had their wax figures featured along with cardboard cutouts of various famous people in the cover art for Sgt. Pepper's Lonely Hearts Club Band (1967).
 Several sculptures from the London branch (including George Bush and Tony Blair) appear in the music video "Pop!ular" by singer-songwriter Darren Hayes.
 Madame Tussauds sculptures are used on the cover of Rick Wakeman's album The Six Wives of Henry VIII. A waxwork of Richard Nixon also appears in the background.

Stage productions
 Marie Tussaud is mentioned in The Scarlet Pimpernel (first run on stage in 1903, first publication 1905).

List of notable wax figures

London

Hollywood

New York City

Nashville

Beijing

Washington, D.C.

Bangkok

Blackpool

Las Vegas

Orlando

San Francisco

Shanghai

Hong Kong

Amsterdam

Vienna

Sydney

Istanbul

Gallery

See also
 Chamber of Horrors (Madame Tussauds), London
 Marie Tussaud
 Madame Tussauds Amsterdam
 Madame Tussauds Beijing
 Madame Tussauds Blackpool
 Madame Tussauds Delhi
 Madame Tussauds Hollywood
 Madame Tussauds Hong Kong
 Madame Tussauds Las Vegas
 Madame Tussauds New York
 Madame Tussauds Rock Circus (1989–2001, London)
 Madame Tussauds San Francisco
 Madame Tussauds Shanghai
 Madame Tussauds Singapore
 Madame Tussauds Sydney
 Madame Tussauds Vienna
 Madame Tussauds Washington D.C.
 Merlin Entertainments

Notes

References

Bibliography

 
 
 
 
 .

External links

 Official website
 

 
Media museums
Wax museums
Merlin Entertainments Group
Amusement museums